Harry Blaney (18 February 1928 – 29 April 2013) was an Irish Independent Fianna Fáil politician. He was a Teachta Dála (TD) for the Donegal North-East constituency. His father was Neal Blaney, who was a TD from 1927 to 1948.

Blaney was defeated by Cecilia Keaveney of Fianna Fáil at the April 1996 by-election resulting from the 1995 death of his brother, Neil Blaney. He called for a recount but the following day was defeated by 150 votes. In 1997, he was elected to Dáil Éireann at the 1997 general election, defeating Paddy Harte. He retired at age 74 at the 2002 general election after serving one term. He was succeeded by his son, Niall Blaney.

His support for the 1997 Ahern government led to the construction of the Harry Blaney Bridge, which opened in 2009 to link the Rosguill and Fanad peninsulas across Mulroy Bay in north County Donegal.

He died on 29 April 2013.

See also
Families in the Oireachtas

References

1928 births
2013 deaths
Harry
Independent Fianna Fáil TDs
Local councillors in County Donegal
Members of the 28th Dáil